Nana Obiri - Yeboah (born March 28, 1983) is a Ghanaian film director. He is known for the 2015 film The Cursed Ones, which received 13 nominations at the Africa Movie Academy Awards, including Best Film and Best Director.

Early life 
Nana Obiri-Yeboah was born on March 28, 1979, in Accra, Ghana. He wrote and Directed his first Play at the age of 14 years at his local church.

Awards and nominations

References

External links 
 

1979 births
Living people
Ghanaian film directors
Best Director Africa Movie Academy Award winners